Jonathan Villanueva (born March 30, 1988 in Dallas, Texas) is an American former soccer player who last played for Richmond Kickers in the USL Second Division.

Career

Youth and College
Villanueva grew up in Grand Prairie, Texas, and attended South Grand Prairie High School, where he was a three-time NSCAA All-American, an adidas ESP Invitee and adidas All-Star, was named to the Parade All-America team as the top midfielder in the country as a senior, and was rated as the nation's top soccer recruit by School Sports Magazine.

He subsequently played four years of college soccer at the University of Virginia, being named to the ACC All-Freshman Team following his debut season in 2006, to the ACC All-Tournament team as a junior in 2008, and being named the Most Outstanding Offensive Player after leading UVA to the 2009 NCAA College Cup.

Professional
Surprisingly un-drafted out of college, Villanueva turned professional in 2010 when he signed with the Richmond Kickers of the USL Second Division. He made his professional debut on April 24, 2010 in a league match against the Charlotte Eagles, and scored his first professional goal on May 21, 2010, also in a game against Charlotte. At the end of the 2010 season, Villaneuva's contract was not renewed.

Personal life 
After leaving professional soccer, Villaneuva became a courier for Express Packages from 2010 until 2014. Since 2014, he has been a real estate agent for Keller Williams Realty, and resides in his native, Dallas.

References

External links
 Virginia bio

1988 births
Living people
American soccer players
American real estate brokers
People from Grand Prairie, Texas
Richmond Kickers players
Soccer players from Texas
Sportspeople from the Dallas–Fort Worth metroplex
United States men's under-20 international soccer players
Virginia Cavaliers men's soccer players
USL Second Division players
Association football midfielders
NCAA Division I Men's Soccer Tournament Most Outstanding Player winners